The members of the 9th General Assembly of Newfoundland were elected in the Newfoundland general election held in November 1865. The general assembly sat from 1866 to 1869.

A coalition government led by Frederick Carter won the election and Carter served as Newfoundland's premier. Not all members of the coalition supported Canadian Confederation.

William Whiteway was chosen as speaker.

Sir Anthony Musgrave served as colonial governor of Newfoundland.

In 1869, draft terms for union of Newfoundland with Canada were presented to and accepted by the Canadian parliament. Premier Carter did not feel that he had a mandate to enter Confederation and called an election to allow the issue to be decided by the electorate.

Members of the Assembly 
The following members were elected to the assembly in 1865:

Notes:

By-elections 
By-elections were held to replace members for various reasons:

Notes:

References 

Newfoundland
009
1866 establishments in the British Empire